Jeremiah Langhorne (died 1742) was a prominent landowner and jurist in colonial Pennsylvania. He is the namesake of present-day Langhorne, Pennsylvania, which adopted his name in 1876, and neighboring Langhorne Manor.

A Quaker, Langhorne settled with his family in Bucks County in 1684. Records show that he purchased  there in 1724. He represented Bucks County in the Pennsylvania Provincial Assembly, of which he served twice as Speaker. He was a justice of the Pennsylvania Supreme Court from 1726, and served as chief justice from 1739 until his death in 1742.

References

Members of the Pennsylvania Provincial Assembly
People from Bucks County, Pennsylvania
American Quakers
1742 deaths
Year of birth unknown
People of colonial Pennsylvania
Justices of the Supreme Court of Pennsylvania